Rosserk Friary is a friary located in County Mayo, Ireland and a National Monument. Located along the river Moy, the friary was set up by the third order of Franciscans.

History
Rosserk Friary is one of the largest and best preserved of the Franciscan Friaries in Ireland. It was founded by the Joye  family circa 1441 for the Friars of the Franciscan Third Order Regular.

Rosserk Friary and Moyne Abbey are located close to each other, north of Ballina on the west side of Killala Bay. Both were allegedly burnt by Sir Richard Bingham, Elizabeth I of England's governor of Connacht, in 1590 in reformationist zeal.

Description

The stone doorway leading to the church still shows fine workmanship and carvings. The church is built in the late Irish Gothic Style and consists of a single-aisle nave, with two chantry chapels in the south transept and a bell-tower suspended over the chancel arch. In the south-east corner of the chancel is a double piscina with a Round Tower carved on one of its pillars, two angels and the instruments of the passion.

The conventual buildings are well-preserved with three vaulted rooms on each side. The dormitory, refectory and kitchen were on the upper floor, where two fireplaces still remain back-to-back.

Gallery

See also 
 List of abbeys and priories in Ireland (County Mayo)

References

Citations

Sources

External links
 Rosserk Friary Co. Mayo

Buildings and structures in County Mayo
Franciscan monasteries in the Republic of Ireland
Religion in County Mayo
Ruins in the Republic of Ireland
Christian monasteries established in the 15th century
National Monuments in County Mayo
Gothic architecture in the Republic of Ireland